Robert Forest (born 18 November 1961) is a former French professional cyclist. He is most known for winning one stage in the 1987 Giro d'Italia.

References

French male cyclists
1961 births
Living people
French Giro d'Italia stage winners
Sportspeople from Toulouse
Cyclists from Occitania (administrative region)